The 1938 Kansas Jayhawks football team represented the University of Kansas in the Big Six Conference during the 1938 college football season. In their seventh and final season under head coach Adrian Lindsey, the Jayhawks compiled a 3–6 record (1–4 against conference opponents), finished in last place in the conference, and were outscored by opponents by a combined total of 169 to 132. They played their home games at Memorial Stadium in Lawrence, Kansas.

The team's statistical leaders included Dick Amerine with 277 rushing yards, Ralph Miller with 407 passing yards, Max Replogle with 259 receiving yards, and Bill Bunsen with 24 points scored (four touchdowns). Dave Shirk was the team captain.

Schedule

References

Kansas
Kansas Jayhawks football seasons
Kansas Jayhawks football